Pulhatyn Sanctuary is a sanctuary (zakaznik) of Turkmenistan. 

It is part of Bathyz Nature Reserve. It was established as a watering place for animals.

External links
https://web.archive.org/web/20090609072344/http://natureprotection.gov.tm/reserve_tm.html

Sanctuaries in Turkmenistan